Joel De La Cruz Santos (born June 9, 1989) is a Dominican former professional baseball pitcher. He has played in Major League Baseball (MLB) for the Atlanta Braves.

Career

Milwaukee Brewers
De La Cruz signed with the Milwaukee Brewers in 2006 and was assigned to the team's Arizona League affiliate he played in the Brewers organization until 2009.

Washington Nationals
He was signed and later released by the Washington Nationals in 2009.

New York Yankees
The New York Yankees signed De La Cruz in 2010. He spent his first season with the Yankees in the Dominican Summer League and was promoted to the Tampa Yankees of the Florida State League during the 2011 season. De La Cruz split the 2012 season between the Charleston RiverDogs and Tampa. He was assigned to Tampa for the entirety of the 2013 season. The Yankees promoted De La Cruz to the Trenton Thunder of the Double-A Eastern League at the start of 2014, and later promoted him to the Triple-A Scranton/Wilkes-Barre RailRiders. De La Cruz resigned with the Yankees in September 2014, and started the 2015 season with the Trenton Thunder. The Yankees promoted him to the major leagues on April 13, 2015, to replace Kyle Davies. The Yankees outrighted him off of the 40-man roster on April 18. He then split the season between Trenton and Scranton/Wilkes-Barre.

Atlanta Braves
De La Cruz became a minor league free agent after the 2015 season, and signed with the Braves. The Braves promoted De La Cruz to the major leagues on April 11 and May 20, 2016, each time for one day only. He was outrighted off the Braves 40-man roster later that week, having made no major league appearances. The Braves recalled De La Cruz for the third time during the 2016 season on June 29, and he made his major league debut that night. De La Cruz spent the season shifting between the bullpen and starting rotation. He was released on October 23, 2017.

References

External links

1989 births
Living people
Arizona League Brewers players
Atlanta Braves players
Charleston RiverDogs players
Dominican Republic expatriate baseball players in the United States
Dominican Summer League Nationals players
Dominican Summer League Yankees players
Gwinnett Braves players
Gulf Coast Yankees players

Major League Baseball pitchers
Major League Baseball players from the Dominican Republic
People from Bajos de Haina
Scranton/Wilkes-Barre RailRiders players
Tampa Yankees players
Toros del Este players
Trenton Thunder players